Reşatbey is a mahalle in the Seyhan district of the city of Adana. The neighborhood is part of the downtown, situated north of the D400 state road and west of the Seyhan River.

Governance
Reşatbey is a mahalle and it is administered by the Muhtar and the Seniors Council.

Demographics
The population of Reşatbey as of December 31, 2014 is 12,968. Most of the residents of Reşatbey, are from families that live in Adana for several generations.

Economy
Reşatbey is a wealthy neighbourhood, resided by many business owners and farmers. Education levels are higher than most of the neighborhoods of Adana. Adana Provincial Municipality, Ministry of Forestry Provincial Headquarters are located within the neighborhood.

Transport
Şakirpaşa Airport is 3 km west of the neighborhood and can accessed by Bus #159.

Adana Central railway station is 1 km north of the neighborhood, at the Kurtuluş neighborhood.

Adana Metropolitan Municipality Bus Department (ABBO) has bus routes from Reşatbey to most of the neighborhoods of Adana.

References

Neighborhoods/Settlements in Adana